Murat Karayalçın (born 1943) is a prominent Turkish politician. He is a former foreign minister (1994–1995), deputy prime minister, and a former mayor of Ankara (1989–1993). He is the founder (in 2002) of the new SHP.

Of Hamsheni origin, Karayalçın was educated at Ankara University Faculty of Political Sciences and at the University of East Anglia where he graduated with a master's degree in Development Economics in 1977. He was elected leader of the SODEP on 11 September 1993, succeeding Erdal İnönü and served as the deputy prime minister briefly in the 50th government of Turkey. The party merged with the CHP in 1995.

He was nominated by the CHP as candidate for mayor of Ankara in the 2009 local elections, in which he gained 31.50% of all votes.

In 2002 he founded the new SHP.

References

Sources

External links 

 Biyografi.info - Biography of Murat Karayalçın 
 Biyografi.net - Biography of Murat Karayalçın 

1943 births
Living people
Alumni of the University of East Anglia
People from Hemşin
Social Democratic Populist Party (Turkey) politicians
Social Democratic People's Party (Turkey) politicians
Contemporary Republican People's Party (Turkey) politicians
Mayors of Ankara
Ministers of Foreign Affairs of Turkey
Deputy Prime Ministers of Turkey
Leaders of political parties in Turkey
Turkish people of Hemshin descent
Deputies of Rize
Members of the 20th Parliament of Turkey
Members of the 50th government of Turkey